Claude Edwin Reeds (November 12, 1890 – April 30, 1974) was an American football player and coach. He played college football at the University of Oklahoma as a fullback from 1910 to 1913. Reeds served as the head football coach at Southwestern Normal School—now Southwestern Oklahoma State University—from 1914 to 1915, at West Texas State Teachers College—now West Texas A&M University—from 1929 to 1930, and at Central State Teachers College—now the University of Central Oklahoma—from 1931 to 1940, compiling a career coaching record of 72–41–11. He was inducted into the College Football Hall of Fame as a player in 1961.

Head coaching record

Football

Basketball

References

External links
 
 

1890 births
1974 deaths
American football fullbacks
Central Oklahoma Bronchos athletic directors
Central Oklahoma Bronchos football coaches
Central Oklahoma Bronchos men's basketball coaches
Colorado State Rams baseball coaches
Colorado State Rams football coaches
Oklahoma Sooners football coaches
Oklahoma Sooners football players
Southwestern Oklahoma State Bulldogs football coaches
West Texas A&M Buffaloes football coaches
College Football Hall of Fame inductees
Sportspeople from Norman, Oklahoma
Coaches of American football from Oklahoma
Players of American football from Oklahoma
Baseball coaches from Oklahoma
Basketball coaches from Oklahoma